The Road Goes on Forever is the third and final studio album by the American country music supergroup the Highwaymen. It was released on April 4, 1995, on Liberty Records and reached 45 on the U.S. Billboard Top Country Albums chart.
The title track of this album was written by Robert Earl Keen, Jr. and originally recorded on his 1989 album, West Textures.

Reissue
The album was re-released on November 8, 2005, on Capitol Nashville/EMI with bonus tracks and, in some versions, an extra DVD for the album's 10th anniversary. The DVD includes a music video for "It Is What It Is", as well as a short documentary entitled Live Forever - In the Studio with the Highwaymen.

Track listing

2005 bonus disc (DVD)
 Live Forever – In the Studio with the Highwaymen (video)
 "It Is What It Is" (video)

Charts
Album - Billboard (United States)

Personnel

The Highwaymen
Johnny Cash – vocals, guitar
Waylon Jennings – vocals, guitar
Kris Kristofferson – vocals, guitar
Willie Nelson – vocals, guitar

Additional musicians
Kenny Aronoff – drums
Benmont Tench – Hammond C-3
Mark Goldenberg – acoustic guitar, baritone guitar, electric guitar
Al Anderson – electric and acoustic guitar
Reggie Young – electric guitar
Michael Rhodes – bass
Mickey Raphael – harmonica
Robby Turner – pedal steel, dobro
Danny Timms – piano
Luis Resto – Wurlitzer electric piano

Technical personnel
Produced by: Don Was
Recorded By: Rik Pekkonen at Ocean Way, Hollywood, CA
Assisted By: Young Dan Bosworth
Second Assistants: Trini Alveraz and Jeff Demorris
Additional Recording by Barry Taylor at Caravell, Branson, MO
Mixed By: Chuck Ainlay at Record Planet, Hollywood, CA
Assisted By: Brian Pollack
Minister of Information: Jane Oppenheimer
Album Production Coordinator: Carrie McConkey for The Marsha Burns Company
Consigliere: Mart Rothbaum
Art Direction: Sherri Halford and Buddy Jackson
Design: B. Middleworth for Jackson Design
Cover Photography: Frank Ockenfels
Additional Photography: Patrick Ockenfels
Makeup: Diane Weidenmann

Reissue Credits
Producer: Don Was
Reissue Producer: Rob Christie
Remastering: Ed Cherney and Ron McMaster @ Capitol Studios, Hollywood
Remixing: ("If He Came Back Home Again"): Don Was and Ed Cherney
Liner Notes: Chet Flippo, Willie Nelson, Kris Kristofferson
Art Design: Shannon Ward for Den 45 @ EMI
Design: Rene Neri for Den 145 @ EMI
Photography: Frank Ockenfels, Patrick Simpson

References

External links

1995 albums
2005 albums
The Highwaymen (country supergroup) albums
Liberty Records albums
Capitol Records albums
EMI Records albums
Albums produced by Don Was